Inape arcuata is a species of moth of the family Tortricidae which is endemic to Peru.

The ground colour of the forewings is pale ferruginous. The markings on the costal half of the wing are dark black-brown. The hindwings are creamish, tinged brownish grey in the posterior half, with darker spots.

Etymology
The species name refers to the curvature of the transtilla and is derived from Latin arcuatus (meaning arched).

References

Moths described in 2010
Endemic fauna of Peru
Moths of South America
arcuata
Taxa named by Józef Razowski